Baigts-de-Béarn is a commune in the Pyrénées-Atlantiques department in the Nouvelle-Aquitaine region of south-western France.

The inhabitants of the commune are known as Batchois or Batchoises.

Geography
Baigts-de-Béarn is located some 6 km north-west of Orthez and 23 km east of Peyrehorade. The western part of the northern border of the commune is also the departmental border between Pyrénées-Atlantiques and Landes. Access to the commune is by road D817 from Puyoô in the west which passes through the south of the commune and the village and continues south-east to Orthez. The D415 (the old Route Imperiale) branches from the D817 west of the commune and passes through the village before continuing east to Orthez. The D315 goes north from the village then east to Saint-Boès. The D915 goes north from the D315 to Saint-Girons-en-Béarn. The A64 autoroute passes through the southern tip of the commune but there is no exit with the nearest exit being Exit  some 3 km west of the commune. The commune is mostly farmland with scattered forests.

The Gave de Pau forms the southern border of the commune as it flows west to join the Gave d'Oloron at Peyrehorade. Numerous streams rise in the commune and flow south to join the Gave de Pau including the Ruisseau de Montlong. The Ruisseau de Lataillade forms the northern border of the commune as it flows west and forms part of the departmental border with Landes before joining the Gave de Pau west of Puyoô. The Arriou de Bardj rises in the north of the commune and flows west then south to join the Gave de Pau east of Ramous.

Places and hamlets

 Arritor
 Balagué
 Barroumères
 Bassot
 Bellevue (château)
 Bergeras
 Bernet
 Bizens
 Bordenave
 Bourdieu
 Brana
 Brau
 Capdebielle
 Cassecour
 Castéra
 Castillon
 Caubraque
 Caupet
 Cossou
 Cuyoula
 Domblides
 Fayet
 Gassiou
 Gayou
 Les Glycines
 Grihou
 Hau
 Hourquebie
 Hourquérou
 Hourquet
 Hours
 Labasse
 Labiste
 Laborde
 Laboudigue
 Lacabanne
 Lacarrère
 Lacrouts
 Lagouarde
 Lagourque
 Lahéouguère
 Lalanne
 Lanuque
 Latéoulère
 Laulhé
 Loustaunau
 Luns
 Martimour
 Mongay
 Mousquès
 Panaut
 Parrabéou
 Pédeboscq
 Petit
 Peyrou
 Pierroulin
 Pitche
 Planté
 Pommes
 Poublan
 Pourret
 Régis
 Rey
 Riche
 Saint-Laurent
 Sére
 Temple
 Tilhète
 Toucayré
 Touriangle (château)

Neighbouring communes and villages

Toponymy
The commune name in béarnais is Vaths de Bearn.

The name Baigts means "valley" in Gascon but, according to Michel Grosclaude that meaning is to be avoided. According to him Baigts comes from the Gascon vaths which is derived from vallis meaning "hollow" or "depression" or from vallum meaning "palisade" or "entrenchment". In the old village there is a Rue de l'Embarrat meaning "fortified redoubt".

The following table details the origins of the commune name and other names in the commune.

Sources:
Raymond: Topographic Dictionary of the Department of Basses-Pyrenees, 1863, on the page numbers indicated in the table. 
Cassini: Cassini Map from 1750

Origins:
Fors de Béarn
Béarn: Titles of Béarn, 
Garos: Notaries of Garos
Reformation: Reformation of Béarn
Alienations: Alienations of the Diocese of Dax
Census: Census of Béarn

History
Paul Raymond noted on page 19 of his 1863 dictionary that the commune depended on the Diocese of Dax and was the capital of the Notary of Rivière-Gave, the name of an arch-priesthood of the diocese of Dax which gave its name to the Gave de Pau. In 1385 the commune had 59 fires.

Administration

List of Successive Mayors

Inter-communality
The commune is part of three inter-communal structures:
 the Communauté de communes de Lacq-Orthez;
 the water and sanitation association of Trois Cantons;
 the Energy association of Pyrénées-Atlantiques;

Demography
In 2017 the commune had 876 inhabitants.

Economy
In addition to an economy focused on agriculture (livestock and corn), the commune has a hydroelectric plant.

The commune is part of the appellation d'origine contrôlée (AOC) zone of Béarn.

Culture and heritage

Civil heritage
The Chateau of Bellevue is a nursing home for disabled workers.

Religious heritage
The Parish Church of Saint Vincent and Saint Bartholomew (17th century) is registered as an historical monument.

Facilities
The commune has a primary school.

See also
Communes of the Pyrénées-Atlantiques department

References

External links

Baigts on the 1750 Cassini Map

Communes of Pyrénées-Atlantiques